Frances Aviva Blane ( Sternberg), is an English abstract painter who works in the Expressionist tradition. Her subject matter is the disintegration of paint and personality. Blane also draws. However, whereas her paintings are mainly non-referential, the drawings are often of heads, although, as in her paintings, the "heads" are deconstructed which echo her words "broken-up paint, broken-up heads". In 2014, her drawings were shown in an exhibition entitled Deconstruct at De Queeste Kunstkamers, Belgium. She has exhibited in Britain, Europe, Australia and Japan.

“They are desperate paintings, fetching isolated and sombre emotion from the deep recesses – they are 'primeval, before language, dredged from the back of your mind'. They are Beckett-like landscapes and express something like anxiety, unease, restlessness, all tinged with melancholy or plain sadness.”

Dr Edward Winters, West Dean College, 2005, from the introduction in the catalogue for Frances Aviva Blane's show, Prime Time: Painting, Frances Aviva Blane – paintings & drawings 2006 at Galerie Seitz & Partner, Berlin, January – February 2006

“Blane’s drawings are not for the faint-hearted. They are very demanding and what they demand is attention. Blane seeks to find the fewest marks that will carry the emotional energy she pours into every work. Such loaded distillations require input and work on the part of the viewer as well. They incite a response.
‘I want to make a mark that no has ever seen before.’ And so she does.”

Doris Lockhart Saatchi, London, 2005, from the introduction in the catalogue for Frances Aviva Blane's show, Prime Time: Painting, Frances Aviva Blane: paintings & drawings 2006 at Galerie Seitz & Partner, Berlin, January – February 2006

Education 
Blane studied at Chelsea School of Art (1988), Byam Shaw School of Painting and Drawing (1991) and the Slade School of Fine Art, London (1993).

Films 
 Who is Frances Aviva Blane? (2020) directed by Penny Woolcock, camera Leo Regan, editing Alex Fry

 Two Metres Apart with Susie Orbach (2020) directed by Penny Woolcock

Books 
FRANCES (2021) by Susie Orbach, Eddy Frankel and Corinna Lotz
COVID (2020) by Susie Orbach and Frances Aviva Blane – a book of paintings and drawings made by Blane during the first COVID-19 lockdown with an essay by Orbach. 
Who is Frances Aviva Blane? (2020) Blane, Orbach, Woolcock. A book accompanying the film of the same name directed by Penny Woolcock.
 NOTHING by Frances Aviva Blane, a book of paintings and works on paper with a catalogue essay by Diana Souhami was published by Starmount Publications in 2015.
 EMBASSY by Frances Aviva Blane. A book of paintings and drawings chronicling Blane's exhibition at the German Embassy London with introduction by Tess Jaray was published by Starmount Publications in 2017.
 MORE Works on Paper by Frances Aviva Blane with essay by Mark Gisbourne was published by Starmount Publications in January 2018 
 FAB by Frances Aviva Blane with introduction by Susie Orbach was published by Starmount Publications in 2019

Exhibitions 

Blane's first show in London was curated by Andrew Mummery, a British gallerist. She is also an award-winner of the Jerwood Drawing Prize (1999) and took part in their exhibition Drawing Breath, an anniversary show.

Blane has been included in many group shows including Chora (London and touring the UK) curated by art critic Sue Hubbard and Women's Contemporary Self Portraits at the Usher Gallery (Lincoln and touring). Blane also showed at the Annely Juda Gallery in the exhibition Annely Juda – A Celebration. She has had two-handed exhibitions with Basil Beattie and John Mclean, both prominent British abstract painters.

She was sponsored by the British Council and the Goethe Institut to take part in a painting swap with German artists. She has also exhibited at The Architectural Biennale in Clerkenwell in 2004 and at Our Most Holy Redeemer Church in Exmouth Market.

Selected solo shows 
 Frances Aviva Blane, Dark, De Queeste Kunstkamers, Abele/Watou, Belgium from 11 November to 9 December 2018
 Blane. Broken Heads, Broken Paint, 12 Star Gallery at Europe House, London 2018
 Two Faces, a show of work by Frances Aviva Blane, The German Ambassador's Residence, London, 2016 – 2017
 Deconstruct, Frances Aviva Blane shown alongside exhibitions of Francis Bacon and Louise Bourgeois, De Queeste Kunstkamers, Abele/Watou, Belgium, 2014
 Big Black Paintings, Bay Hall, Kings College, London, 2014
 Frances Aviva Blane, Paintings & Drawings, De Queeste Kunstkamers, Abele/Watou, Belgium, 2013
 Paintings and Works on Paper, Quest 21, Brussels, 2011
 Portrait/Painting, Shillam and Smith3 London, 2006
 Prime Time: Painting, Frances Aviva Blane – paintings & drawings at Galerie Seitz & Partner, Berlin, 2006
 Paintings in The Church of Our Most Holy Redeemer, ecArtspace, Exmouth Market, London, 2004
 Frances Aviva Blane Paintings and Drawings ecArtspace in conjunction with London Architecture Biennale, St John's Street EC1, 2004 
 Delinquent Paintings, ecArtspace, 2001
 Berry House Solo x 9: artists in Clerkenwell – including Susan Hiller, 1998
 Frances Aviva Blane Drawing, Shillam Smith 3, 1997
 F Blane Only, curated by Andrew Mummery, London, 1996
 Curwen Gallery, London, curated by Andrew Mummery, 1995

Selected group shows 
 Basil Beattie + Frances Blane  drawings and paintings, (20th anniversary show), ecArtspace @ Burgh House, London, 2022
 Trinity Buoy Wharf Drawing Prize, 2021
 Moi et Les Autres. A group show with Daniel Enkaoua Etc. De Queeste Kunstkamers Abele/Watou Belgium, 2021
 Ruth Borchard Collection, The Self Portrait Prize, 2021
 Art from The Heart, Zuleika Gallery Exhibition in aid of Maggies Cancer Centre with Anish Kapoor, Trevor Sutton and Claudia Clare, 2021
 Sea of Change with Stockwell and Jason Oddy online at www.ecartspace.com and Lemnos Greece, 2021
 Fragmented, with Claudia Clare, Zuleika Gallery, London SW1, 2020
 Distancing’, with Basil Beattie, Susan Stockwell, Dryden Goodwin, ecArtspace online, 2020
 The Desire Of Looking, with Daniel Enkaoua, Marcelle Hanselaar, De Queeste Kunstkamers Abele/Watou Belgium, 2020
 Age is Just a Number, Summer Show at Zuleika Gallery, London SW1, 2019
 Ikonoclash #01 including Anton Kannemeyer and Marcelle Hanselaar, De Queeste Kunstamers, Abele/Watou Belgium, 2019
 Abstract Allies including Trevor Sutton, Nigel Hall at Zuleika Gallery, London SW1, 2019
 John Moores Painting Prize, Walker Gallery, Liverpool, 2018
HUMAN, The German Embassy, London, October 2017
 Creekside Open 2017 selected by Jordan Baseman 
 Liquid Thought, with Daniel Enkaoua and Chris Stevens, De Queeste Kunstkamers, Abele/Watou, Belgium, 2016
 Impact, with Louise Bourgeois, Marthe Zink, De Queeste Kunstkamers, Abele/Watou, Belgium, 2016
 Jerwood Drawing Prize 2015 – 2016. London and UK tour
 De Vage Grens, with Frank Auerbach, Reniere&Depla, etc. De Queeste Kunstkamers, Abele/Watou, Belgium, 2015
 Critics Circle, Selector Corinna Lotz, Mall Galleries, London, 2013
 Drawing Breath, Jerwood Anniversary Exhibition, London, Sydney, Bristol, 2006 – 2008
 Annely Juda A Celebration. Annely Juda Fine Art, London, 2007
 Marlborough Fine Art, The London Print Fair, 2006
 Blind Art, Royal Cornwall Museum, Truro, 2005
 Sense and Sensuality, Blind Art, London, New York, Leicester, 2006
 Blind Art, Royal College of Art, London, 2005
 Weiss zieht und gewinnt, Galerie Seitz & Partners, Berlin, 2005
 Small is Beautiful, Flowers Central, London, 2004
 Very British?, Arbeiten von Britschen Kunstlerinnen with Tacita Dean, Mike Silva, Die Drostei, Pinneberg, 2004
 The Discerning Eye, Mall Galleries London, 2004
 Art Works in Mental Health, Royal College of Art, London, touring Cardiff, Birmingham, Edinburgh, Manchester, 2003
 Dialogue with Nigel Ellis, ecArtspace London, 2002
 Absolut Secret, Royal College of Art, London, 2002 − 2004, 2006 − 2010
 Drawings for All, Gainsborough's House, Suffolk, 2002     
 The Contemporary Art Society, Art Futures, 2002
 German and English Painting Swap, Berlin/London, sponsored by the British Council and Goethe institut, 2002
 Drawing – Frances Aviva Blane with Basil Beattie, ecArtspace, London, 2001
 Galerie Stuhler, Berlin, 2000, 2001
 Jerwood Open Drawing Show award winner touring Berlin and Ghent, 2000
  Before, Now and After with Helen Sears and Sheila Gaffney, Berlin and London, 2000
 Painting with John Mclean, 53–54 St John's Square, London, 2000
 Chora, curated by Sue Hubbard, London and touring, 1999–2000
 The Cheltenham Open Drawing Show, 1999
 Small is Beautiful, Flowers Gallery East, 1999–2003
 In The Looking Glass, women contemporary self-portraits, Usher Gallery Lincoln and touring, 1996
 The London Group  Biennial exhibition, Barbican Centre, 1995
 Royal Academy of Art, Summer Exhibition, 1995
 Into the Nineties, Pick of the Postgraduates, showcase of new artists, Mall Galleries, 1993

Awards 
 Jerwood Drawing Prize, 1999
 Mid-America ART Alliance Fellowship for Visual Arts, 1998
 Residency at Djerassi Artists' Foundation, California, 1998
 Graham Hamilton Drawing Prize, 1991

References

External links 
 Official site
 De Queeste Art Gallery

Living people
Year of birth missing (living people)
20th-century British women artists
21st-century British women artists
20th-century English painters
Alumni of the Slade School of Fine Art
Artists from London
British abstract artists
English contemporary artists
English Jews
English people of Hungarian-Jewish descent
English women painters
Jewish painters
People from Hampstead
20th-century English women
21st-century English women
21st-century English people